The Budieru is a river in Arad County, western Romania. Formerly a left tributary of the river Crișul Alb, it presently flows into the Canalul Morilor, which discharges into the Crișul Alb. The river is mostly channelized and is integrated into the drainage system of the area.

Hydronymy 
The Hungarian name of the river (Büdos Ér) means "lazy brook". The Romanian name derives from that.

References

Rivers of Romania
Rivers of Arad County